The 2014–15 SC Freiburg season was the 111th season in the football club's history and sixth consecutive and 16th overall season in the top flight of German football, the Bundesliga, having been promoted from the 2. Bundesliga in 2009. SC Freiburg also participated in the season's edition of the domestic cup, the DFB-Pokal. It was the 60th season for SC Freiburg in the Schwarzwald-Stadion, located in Freiburg im Breisgau. It covered a period from 25 June 2014 to 24 June 2015.

Season overview

Background
SC Freiburg finished the previous season in 14th place, two spots above the relegation zone, ensuring that they would participate in this season's Bundesliga. Freiburg advanced to the third round in the previous season, having lost to Bayer Leverkusen. In the previous season, Freiburg was unable to qualify for Europe, having been lower in the table. In the previous season's UEFA Europa League, Freiburg finished third in Group H, having been three points short of second-placed Slovan Liberec.

June
SC Freiburg's pre-season training officially started on 25 June 2014.

In Freiburg's first pre-season friendly of the year, they faced Freiburger Regio-Auswahl on 28 June 2014. The match ended in a 5–0 win for Freiburg. Vladimír Darida opened the scoring for Freiburg in the 13th minute. Sebastian Freis then scored in the 24th minute, with another goal in the 27th minute from Philipp Zulechner to give Freiburg a three-point lead going into half-time. Maximilian Philipp then scored in the 51st minute, and Philipp Zulechner completed a brace in the 68th minute to secure a win for Freiburg. The match ended in the 70th minute due to a thunderstorm.

July
The second pre-season friendly was against FV Tennenbronn on 2 July 2014. The match ended with a 14–0 win for SC Freiburg. Oliver Sorg was the first to score in the 15th minute, followed by goals from Caleb Stanko in the 28th minute, Philipp Zulechner in the 32nd minute, Felix Klaus in the 40th minute, and Sebastian Freis in the 43rd minute to give SC Freiburg a five-point lead at halftime. Karim Guédé then converted from the penalty spot in the 47th minute, followed a brace from Jonathan Schmid in the 53rd and 58th minutes. Nicolas Höfler then scored in the 59th minute, followed another brace from Vladimír Darida in the 61st and 71st minutes. In between, Sebastian Kerk scored his first goal in the 63rd minute, and then completed a hat-trick with additional goals in the 87th and 90th minutes.

The next friendly match SC Freiburg played was against Swiss team FC Winterthur on 5 July 2014. The match ended in a 6–3 win to SC Freiburg. Kristian Kuzmanović scored the first goal in the 9th minute to give his side the lead. SC Freiburg equalized after a goal from Fallou Diagne in the 15th minute, and subsequently gained the lead by a goal from Vladimír Darida in the 20th minute. Antonio Marchesano scored a goal for FC Winterthur in the 29th minute to put the game level at two. In the 31st minute, Sebastian Kerk converted a penalty to regain the lead for SC Freiburg. Mike Frantz completed a brace with goals in the 60th and 74th minute to secure a win for SC Freiburg. Tim Schraml scored in between these goals in the 65th minute.

On 8 July 2014, SC Freiburg faced German club SV Endingen. The match ended in a 0–3 win. Felix Klaus scored the opening goal in the match in the seventh minute. Additional goals from Karim Guédé in the 55th minute and Jonathan Schmid in the 86th minute secured the win.

On 18 July 2014, SC Freiburg played their next pre-season friendly against 2. Bundesliga side VfR Aalen. The match ended in a 1–1 draw. Nejmeddin Daghfous opened the scoring for his side in the 71st minute. SC Freiburg replied with an equalizer in the 82nd minute by Pavel Krmaš to end the match in a draw.

In their third pre-season match, SC Freiburg faced Swiss club FC St. Gallen on 22 July 2014. The match ended in a 1–0 win for SC Freiburg. The only goal of the match came from Charles-Elie Laprévotte in the 9th minute.

Four days later, on 26 July 2014, SC Freiburg faced Torpedo Moscow, a Russian team. The match ended in a 0–2 loss. Dmitry Aydov opened the scoring in the 44th minute from a penalty to give his side the lead before halftime. He then completed a brace by scoring a goal in the 55th minute to give his side the win.

August
On 1 August 2014, SC Freiburg faced fellow city team and Oberliga Baden-Württemberg side Freiburger FC in the semi-finals of the yearly friendly tournament, the Kaiserstuhl Cup. This was the 30th annual pre-season cup. The match ended in a 2–0 win, with goals coming on either side of the half. Denis Perger scored a goal in the 39th minute giving his side a 1-point lead going into halftime. Then, late in the game, Sebastian Freis scored a goal in the 90th minute to put his team up by 2 and secured the win, advancing SC Freiburg to the final.

On 2 August 2014, SC Freiburg faced French team Rennes in the final of the Kaiserstuhl Cup. The match ended in a 1–3 loss. Goals came early for the French opposition. Mexer opened the scoring in the sixth minute, followed by a brace by Paul-Georges Ntep in the 10th and 18th minutes. Felix Klaus put his side on the scoresheet before halftime, in the 44th minute. This was only a consolation goal through, and Rennes won the match, leaving SC Freiburg as runners-up in the Kaiserstuhl Cup.

On 9 August 2014, SC Freiburg played their last pre-season friendly of the year against English club Stoke City. The match ended in a 1–1 draw. Pavel Krmaš opened the scoring in the second minute to give SC Freiburg an early lead. Mame Biram Diouf equalized for his team in the 39th minute, which was the final goal of the match.

SC Freiburg were drawn against Eintracht Trier in the first round of the DFB-Pokal. The match took place on 17 August 2015. The match ended in a 2–0 win. The opposition gathered a total of seven yellow cards during the match. Julian Schuster opened the scoring for SC Freiburg in the 51st minute from a penalty. Then Karim Guédé scored a goal in the 68th minute insuring SC Freiburg would advance to the second round of the DFB-Pokal with the away win.

The opening match of SC Freiburg's Bundesliga campaign was against Eintracht Frankfurt on matchday 1. The match took place on 23 August 2014, and ended in a 0–1 loss. Haris Seferovic scored the only goal of the match for their side. With the away loss SC Freiburg ended the matchday in 16th place.

On matchday 2, on 31 August 2014, SC Freiburg faced Borussia Mönchengladbach, who were sitting at 10th in the league table. The match ended in a 0–0 draw. Admir Mehmedi had a chance to put SC Freiburg up from the penalty spot, but failed to convert SC Freiburg's best opportunity in the 63rd minute. With the home draw, SC Freiburg ended the matchday in 14th place. After this match, the international break started.

September
During the international break, SC Freiburg scheduled a friendly with 2. Bundesliga club 1. FC Kaiserslautern. The match took place on 5 September 2014, and ended in a 0–4 loss. Karim Matmour opened the scoring in the eighth minute, and ended up with a brace with another goal in the 23rd minute. Between these goals, Marcel Gaus put his side up by two. Sebastian Jacob rounded off the scoring with a goal in the 71st minute, securing a win for his side.

October
During the second international break, SC Freiburg scheduled another friendly against Swiss club Young Boys. The match took place on 10 October 2014, and ended in a 2–1 win. Adrian Nikçi opened the scoring for his side in the 57th minute, but SC Freiburg came back to win with goals by Sebastian Freis in the 71st minute and Jonathan Schmid in the 79th minute. The match was cut short in the 80th minute, after there was a floodlight failure.

November
During the third international break, SC Freiburg faced Swiss club FC Aarau on 13 November 2014. The match ended in a 3–1 win for SC Freiburg. Dani Schahin opened the scoring for Freiburg in the 24th minute. Marvin Spielmann then equalized for Aarau in the 72nd minute. Then Sebastian Freis scored five minutes later in the 77th minute, and Christos Almpanis scored in the 79th minute to insure the victory for Freiburg.

December

January
During the winter break, Freiburg scheduled numerous friendlies as they traveled to Spain. On 14 January 2015, Freiburg were scheduled to play two friendly matches. The first was scheduled to be against the Ghana national team, but Ghana cancelled the friendly due to worries about further injuries that could hinder their chances in the 2015 Africa Cup of Nations. Instead, Freiburg faced Albanian team Skënderbeu Korçë. The match ended in a 0–1 loss after Gerhard Progni put his side ahead in the 22nd minute.

The next winter friendly Freiburg played was later that day against fellow Bundesliga club Mainz 05. The result was a 1–0 win with a goal from Sascha Riether in the 30th minute.

Another two additional matches were played on 18 January 2015. The first was against German 3. Liga team Preußen Münster. The match ended in a 4–1 win to Freiburg. Youth team player Florian Kath scored the opening goal in the 5th minute. In the 12th minute, a Preußen Münster defender scored an own goal to double the lead for Freiburg. Jonathan Schmid put another goal back for Freiburg to make the lead three. After half-time, Amaury Bischoff converted a penalty to get his team on the board. Freiburg put another goal back in the 54th minute to wrap up the game.

Later that day, Freiburg played another winter friendly against 3. Liga club Karlsruher SC. The match ended in a 0–5 loss. Park Jung-bin opened the score for Karlsruhe, then Rouwen Hennings scored a goal in the 31st minute to give his side a two-point lead at half-time. In the second half, Iliyan Mitsanski completed a brace in the 49th and 77th minutes, with a goal from Daniel Gordon in between in the 66th minute to wrap up a win for their side. This was Freiburg's last match in Spain.

On 24 January 2015, Freiburg faced Swiss club Basel in their final winter friendly. The match ended in a 0–2 loss. Marco Streller opened the scoring for Basel in the 32nd minute, and Mohamed Elneny doubled it in the 40th minute to secure the win for their side.

The Bundesliga season resumed on 31 January 2015 on matchday 18 against Eintracht Frankfurt. Freiburg won 4–1, one of their largest wins of the season. Freiburg went down a goal after Marco Russ scored a goal in the 1st minute. Freiburg equalized with a penalty taken by Vladimír Darida in the 61st minute. In his league debut versus Eintracht Frankfurt, Nils Petersen scored a hat-trick, despite just coming on as a substitute for the second half. His goals came in the 63rd, 69th and 88th minute, securing the win for Freiburg. With the home win, Freiburg ended the matchday in 14th place.

February

March

April

May
On 2 May 2015, matchday 31 of the Bundesliga, Freiburg faced SC Paderborn at home, who were sitting 17th in the table. Freiburg lost 1–2. Nils Petersen was the first to score in the match, giving Freiburg a lead in the 40th minute. Lukas Rupp equalized for Paderborn in the 70th minute, and completed a brace with another goal in the 80th minute, giving his side the win. Freiburg ended the match in 16th place.

On 8 May 2015, a Friday match, matchday 32 of the Bundesliga, Freiburg faced Hamburger SV away, who were sitting 14th in the table. The match drew 1–1. Admir Mehmedi put Freiburg up in the 25th minute. The score held until the 90th minute, when Gojko Kačar scored a late equalizer for Hamburg to end the match with a draw. Freiburg ended the match in 15th place.

On 16 May 2015, Freiburg were up against Bayern Munich. FC Bayern Munich were 1st in the table, and had already won the Bundesliga. Freiburg had not beaten Bayern in over 19 years. The match ended in a 2–1 win for Freiburg, their first win in the last six matches. Bastian Schweinsteiger scored for Bayern in the 13th minute. Freiburg responded with an equalizer in the 33rd minute by Mehmedi. The game remained level until the 89th minute, when Nils Petersen, a former Bayern player, gave Freiburg a late winner, continuing Bayern's Bundesliga losing streak with three in a row. Freiburg were in 14th place at the end of the matchday, still in a battle to avoid relegation with five other teams. Freiburg would be safe if they at least draw their next match. They would be in the relegation play-off spot if they lose, VfB Stuttgart wins, and Hamburger SV fail to win. They would be relegated if they lost and VfB Stuttgart and Hamburger SV failed won.

Players

Squad information

From youth squad

Loans

Mid-season transfers

Transfers

In

Out

Statistics

Goals and appearances

|-
! colspan="10" style="background: #F2F2F2" | Players who left during the season

Goal scorers table

Assists table

Disciplinary record

|-
! colspan="14" | Players who left during the season

Suspensions

Club staff

Friendlies

30. AXA Kaiserstuhl-Cup 2014

Competitions

Overall

Overview

Bundesliga

League table

Results summary

Results by round

Matches

DFB-Pokal

Notes

References

External links
  
 SC Freiburg on Bundesliga.com

Freiburg
SC Freiburg seasons